Wreckx-n-Effect (originally Wrecks-n-Effect) is an American new jack swing group from Harlem, New York City most known for their No. 1 Rap songs, "New Jack Swing" & their multi-platinum hit "Rump Shaker".

History
Wrecks-n-Effect was founded in 1988 by Aqil Davidson, Markell Riley and Brandon "B-Doggs" Mitchell. A fourth member: Keith "K.C." Harris, was added while creating their demo but was a member only on their debut EP. One year later, Davidson, Riley and Mitchell reconvened and recorded their First LP containing New Jack Swing. Markell Riley is the brother of new jack swing producer Teddy Riley. The group debuted in 1988 on Atlantic Records and soon after transitioned to Motown Records. The group achieved their first number one song on the Billboard Hot Rap Songs chart with the single "New Jack Swing" in 1989 on Motown Records.

In 1990 former member DJ "B-Doggs" Brandon Mitchell was killed in a local shootout, which nearly caused Davidson and Riley to end the group. The group continued after encouragement from producer Teddy Riley and Michael Jackson. Aqil Davidson changed the spelling of Wrecks-n-Effect to Wreckx-n-Effect in honor of Mitchell.

In 1991 Teddy Riley built Future Recording Studios, a multi-million dollar recording studio in Virginia Beach, VA. Among the first records produced at Future Recording Studios was Wreckx-n-Effect's 1992 smash Rump Shaker, which would go on to reach number 2 on the Billboard Hot 100. Wreckx-n-Effect also recorded their 1992 album Hard or Smooth at Future Recording Studios, which would go on to sell roughly 2 million copies and peak at number 16 on the Billboard 200.

Conrad Tillard, then known variously as the Hip Hop Minister and Conrad Muhammad, became a fixture in hip-hop in 1993 after he arranged a meeting and a truce in a feud between rising bands Wreckx-N-Effect and A Tribe Called Quest, that Tillard said threatened to turn Harlem into a "war zone".

Discography

Albums

Singles

References

External links
 

American hip hop groups
African-American musical groups
New jack swing music groups
MCA Records artists
Musical groups established in 1988
Musical groups disestablished in 1996
Motown artists
Atlantic Records artists
American musical trios
Musical groups from Harlem